Bonnie's Bookstore is a word-forming puzzle video game developed by New Crayon Games and published by PopCap Games. On each level, tiles containing one (or in some cases, two) letters are arranged in a specific structure. As in the similar title Bookworm, players use adjacent letters to form valid words, with points being awarded based on the length of the word. In most cases, once a letter is used, it is removed from the board, with existing letters moving downwards and new letters filling in from the top.

Plot

In Bonnie's Bookstore, the titular character runs a bookstore which she has inherited from her deceased grandfather. One day while cleaning the attic, she discovers a series of paintings apparently created by him. The paintings appear to depict scenes from popular children's stories. In a flash of inspiration, Bonnie decides to become an author, writing updated versions of these classic stories while using her grandfather's paintings as the illustrations.

Each of the 50 stages in the game represents a chapter in a book. After completing a certain number of chapters, Bonnie finishes the book she's working on, receiving a congratulatory letter from her publisher and moving on to the next. Bonnie writes a variety of tales, especially fairy tales. Usually, each book is three chapters long.

In order to complete a given level or stage, Bonnie must use a letter from each physical location of the board. Creating a word with a tile which has not previously been used causes the color of the tile at that position to change. Bonnie has only a limited number of turns or moves (with each word consuming one turn) to use every tile position on the board. Creating a word with 6 or more letters adds an extra turn for each letter after 5 letters. At higher difficulty levels, more points are awarded, but the allowed number of turns decreases.

Reception
The website Gamezebo remarked that, despite similarities with existing titles (including PopCap's own Bookworm), Bonnie's Bookstore redeemed itself through fun and challenging gameplay. As a result, it received a score of 3.5 out of 5. The reviewer at GameDaily likened the title to Scrabble, but found the gameplay both rewarding and addictive, landing it a "Perfect 10" score.

References

External links
 Bonnie's Bookstore at New Crayon Games
 Creator of Bonnie's Bookstore discusses the game's development

2005 video games
Flash games
MacOS games
PopCap games
Video games developed in the United States
Windows games
Puzzle video games
Single-player video games
Video games featuring female protagonists